The shortjaw saury (Saurida isarankurai) is a species of lizardfish that lives mainly in the Pacific Ocean.

Information
S. isarankurai is known to be found in a marine environment within a demersal range. This species is native to a tropical environment. The average length of S. isarankurai is about 12 centimeters or about 4.72 inches. This species is native to the areas of Western Central Pacific and the Gulf of Thailand. They are known to be found on sandy or muddy bottoms. This species serves as no threat or harm to humans.

References

Notes
 

Synodontidae
Fish described in 1972